The 2017 League of Ireland Cup Final was the final match of the 2017 League of Ireland Cup (called the EA Sports Cup for sponsorship purposes), a knock-out association football competition contested annually by clubs affiliated with the League of Ireland. It took place on 17 September 2017 at the Tallaght Stadium in Dublin, and was contested by Dundalk and Shamrock Rovers. Dundalk won 3–0 to win the competition for the sixth time.

Background
The League Cup was the first trophy of the 2017 League of Ireland season. The two sides had met three times in the League already that season, with Dundalk winning the first match and Rovers the next two. Dundalk had last won the cup in 2014 (defeating Rovers in the final), and reached the final by defeating UCD in a penalty shoot-out (after a 1–1 draw), Waterford (3–0), and Galway United (3–0).

Shamrock Rovers had last won the League Cup in 2013. To get to the final they overcame Bohemians (3–1), Longford Town (1–0) and Cork City (1–0 after extra-time).

The final was broadcast live on Eir Sport.

Match

Summary
David McMillan put Dundalk ahead with a header from a corner after five minutes, and there were chances for both sides in the rest of the first half, with Rovers hitting the post on one occasion. The second half saw Dundalk dominate, particularly after Aaron Bolger was sent off for a reckless challenge on Dundalk defender Niclas Vemmelund. Patrick McEleney got their second with a strike from the edge of the penalty area in the 81st minute, and deep into injury time substitute Thomas Stewart scored a third to seal the club's sixth League Cup.

Details

References

External links
EA SPORTS Cup Final - Behind The Scenes. FAI TV, via YouTube

League of Ireland Cup finals
League Cup Final
Cup Final
League Of Ireland Cup Final 2017
League Of Ireland Cup Final 2017